Nyctemera popiya is a moth of the family Erebidae first described by Charles Swinhoe in 1903. It is found on Java in Indonesia.

References

Nyctemerina
Moths described in 1903